Talanov is a Russian masculine surname, its feminine counterpart is Talanova. It may refer to

Dariya Talanova (born 1995), Kyrgyzstani swimmer
Ivan Talanov (1910–1991), Russian football player
Khioniya Talanova (1822—1880), Russian stage actress
Nadezhda Talanova (born 1967), Russian biathlete

Russian-language surnames